The Independent Network News (INN) (later retitled INN: The Independent News and USA Tonight) was an American syndicated television news program that ran from June 9, 1980, to June 1990. The program aired seven nights a week on various independent stations across the United States and was designed to serve those stations in the same manner that the "Big Three" network news programs – ABC World News Tonight, NBC Nightly News and the CBS Evening News – served their affiliates.

History
The program debuted on June 9, 1980, under its original title Independent Network News. The newscast was a production of Tribune Broadcasting's New York City station WPIX, and was distributed by Tribune's syndication division as one of the first programs that the company produced for the syndication market, and it was first transmitted via Westar. As INN was produced at WPIX, that station's on-air news staff presided over the broadcast. The nightly broadcast was helmed by a three-anchor team consisting of Pat Harper, Bill Jorgensen, and Steve Bosh with Jerry Girard reporting on sports and Roberto Tirado providing national weather forecasts (Tirado would later be replaced by Bob Harris), and WPIX's local reporting staff was also utilized for the program. Saturday and Sunday editions of INN were added to the schedule in October 1980.

INN also used reports from its member stations, the Associated Press, United Press International, Visnews, and later CNN to supplement its own coverage. WPIX transmitted the national show's live feed at 9:30 p.m. Eastern Time. In the New York City area, WPIX paired a replay of the national INN broadcast at 10 p.m., with its own local newscast at 10:30, called the Action News Metropolitan Report. The newscast carried three minutes of national advertising and three minutes for local ads.

As part of a midday expansion of INN starting in 1981, WPIX also experimented with a half-hour midday newscast at 12:30 p.m. that was co-anchored by Marvin Scott and Claire Carter; this followed the national broadcast which aired at noon. During the decade, WPIX also offered the business-oriented news program The Wall Street Journal Report (which continues to air today in syndication and also airs on CNBC, albeit under the name of On the Money); and the Sunday newsmaker show From the Editor's Desk, hosted by Richard D. Heffner, to stations carrying INN.

Bill Jorgensen left the program (and WPIX) in 1983. Bosh and Harper continued to anchor together for another year until Bosh departed in 1984 to join KDFW-TV in Dallas. Brad Holbrook, who joined the operation a year earlier after anchoring at WNAC-TV/WNEV-TV in Boston, became co-anchor with Harper. Also in 1984, WPIX dropped its Action News branding for the station's local newscasts and decided to rebrand its 7:30 and 10:30 p.m. newscasts as INN: The Independent News. The midday newscast continued (now under the title of INN: Midday Edition) until the fall of 1985, when it was replaced by the lighter-toned Inday News, which focused upon consumer news and human interest stories. Holbrook and Donna Hanover anchored this newscast, which was part of a syndicated block called Inday, a co-venture of Tribune, LBS Communications and Columbia Pictures Television, designed to provide stations with a two-hour block of news and "infotainment"; Inday was cancelled by 1986.

In January 1985, Holbrook's duties were reduced to the early local newscast on WPIX and the midday bulletin; he was replaced on the national INN broadcast and the late local newscast by veteran CBS News correspondent Morton Dean. Four months later Pat Harper left WPIX to join competing New York station WNBC-TV, necessitating replacements for her on all three of WPIX's news productions; on the national broadcast, Sheila Stainback, formerly of WBAL-TV in Baltimore, was brought in to be Dean's new co-anchor.

Beginning on January 12, 1987, the national INN newscast was renamed USA Tonight, keeping that name for the remainder of its run (WPIX, in turn, renamed the local broadcast that followed to New York Tonight), though the INN name continued to be used in voiceovers, graphics and microphone flags. The anchor team was also split up, as Sheila Stainback was reduced to anchoring the WPIX local broadcast that followed the national news, which Morton Dean began anchoring himself. An increased focus was placed on features in the retitled program. A year later, Brad Holbrook returned to USA Tonight after Dean signed with ABC News, and shortly thereafter Stainback returned to the co-anchor position alongside him.

USA Tonight continued to air into 1990, although by then far fewer stations were carrying the broadcast, partly as more focus was being placed on their own local news operations (by this point, the number of independent stations had decreased to some extent due to the earlier 1986 launch of the Fox network). With this in mind, Tribune Broadcasting entered into a collaborative agreement with CNN, which essentially made the then-six station Tribune group news affiliates of the then-Turner Broadcasting System cable channel. The final INN newscast aired on June 23, 1990; through its initial deal with CNN, Tribune retained some of the program's staff as Tribune Broadcasting's Washington, D.C. bureau. On March 13, 2009, Tribune Broadcasting officially closed the Washington bureau as an effect of the Great Recession and the sale of Tribune to Sam Zell afflicting the company with a heavy debt burden which required severe company cutbacks.

Stations airing INN
When INN premiered, the program aired on Tribune's three television stations at the time—WPIX, WGN-TV in Chicago, and KWGN-TV in Denver—and 21 other outlets at launch, a number that rose from 24 stations to 41 before the end of 1980.

By the start of 1983, INN was being aired by 78 stations.

See also 
 All News Channel
 Independent News Network
 NewsNation
 NewsNation Prime
The National Desk

References 

1980s American television news shows
1990s American television news shows
1980 American television series debuts
1990 American television series endings
First-run syndicated television programs in the United States
Television series by Tribune Entertainment